Waghbil is an area located in Thane city, Maharashtra, India, nearly 6 kilometers from Thane railway station. The outer part of Waghbil ie Waghbil Naka is an important bus stop for many buses as well as it has a rickshaw stand. Waghbil has increased in size since 1991. Before that time, Waghbil was considered to be a village but has since been absorbed into Thane city. Waghbil is located about 2 kilometers from Ghodbunder Road highway, the [NH42], while Waghbil Naka is near Ghodbunder Road Highway [NH42] via Waghbil Naka Flyover. Waghbil Village is sheltered by Sanjay Gandhi national Park, Thane Creek and covered with "Aagri Samaj", which is most popular community in Maharashtra. The Hiranandani Estate is one of the adjoining localities to Waghbil. Suraj Water park, the only water park in Thane, is situated on Waghbil Naka.

The famous residential complexes Vijay Nagri, Prestige Residency, Vijay Nagri Annex, Sukhsagar Residency, Swastik Regalia, Green Acres and Vasant Leela are situated here. Also in Wagbil there is a residents welfare group Viz. Waghbil Residents Group which comprises members from 25 plus housing societies of the area, this group works in the area of finding solution of Civic concerns as well as to adopt the best practices to make Waghbill the best livable and lovable location in Thane.

Fishery and farming of rice are the major occupations of this village. Rice bread, steamed rice with meat and fish is their daily diet. Villagers are also involved under business in building material chain. Under which they are providing creek sand and metal stone to local construction projects.

Villagers celebrate Ganesh Utsav, Gopal Kala, Navratri, Hanuman Jayanti and Ram Navmi and funfairs with much fun and devotion.

Mr. Tulshiram Shinge (Senior Social Worker) confirms, Vaishakh Poarnima has first day of Waghbil Fair. On the first day of fair the goddess is worshiped "Mahadu Aai". Second day of the goddess is worshiped "Mari Aai". Villagers organize "Kushti Competition" (कुस्ती स्पर्धा)on the third day. On this occasion many people do travel to participate and watch this competition. This funfair ends on Sanakshti Chaturthi.

During the four-day funfair, people from other villages are invited. The main foods eaten are mutton, chicken, and baked bhakris.

As per Bandhu Gharat (civilian), local villager was built "Mahadu Aai" temple in a night by for devotion of the goddess. Villagers are also participating every year for "Shirdi pedestrian" after Diwali.

Aaagari Vikas Samajik Sanstha in Waghbil Village:

Aaagari Vikas Samajik Sanstha is an active non-governmental organization in Waghbil village which was formed in 2010 by the villagers of Waghbil for the betterment of local people.

Neighbourhoods in Thane